Yaniella is a genus of bacteria from the family Micrococcaceae. Yaniella is named after the Chinese microbiologist Sun-Chu Yan.

References

Further reading 
 

Micrococcaceae
Bacteria genera